The third season of the American comedy-drama television series Ugly Betty was confirmed in the ABC lineup, which was picked up for a full season on February 11, 2008. The season premiere aired on September 25, 2008, and ended with a special double episode on May 21, 2009.

In Australia, season 3 premiered on November 3, 2009, at 7:30 pm EDT. This took place as one of the first exclusive premieres on the new digital channel 7TWO, after over two years of erratic screening of the first two seasons on the Seven Network. In South Africa, season 3 premiered on Tuesday January 13, 2009 in its normal 7:30.P.M CAT timeslot. Season 3 premiered in the UK on Channel 4 on Wednesday June 24, 2009, in the 10:00.P.M. slot, after Big Brother. It changed from Wednesdays to Mondays from Monday October 12, 2009. Episodes finished airing December 2, 2009.

The season would be the first to be produced in the show's setting, New York City, in an attempt to take advantage of a credit change. However, the move would have side effects as several cast and crew members prefer to stay in Los Angeles where the first two seasons were produced which resulted in contributing less onto the show. For example, Ashley Jensen, who plays Christina McKinney, opted to stay in Los Angeles and eventually left the show.

Cast
Most of the main cast from the show's second season returned for the third season, with the former main characters Alexis Meade (played by Rebecca Romijn) and Henry Grubstick (played by Christopher Gorham), becoming recurring characters.

Main cast
 America Ferrera as Betty Suarez
 Eric Mabius as Daniel Meade' Judith Light as Claire Meade
 Vanessa L. Williams as Wilhelmina Slater
 Becki Newton as Amanda Tanen
 Ana Ortiz as Hilda Suarez
 Ashley Jensen as Christina McKinney
 Tony Plana as Ignacio Suarez
 Michael Urie as Marc St. James
 Mark Indelicato as Justin Suarez

Recurring cast
 Bernadette Peters as Jodi Papadakis
 Sarah Lafleur as Molly Meade
 Rebecca Romijn as Alexis Meade
 Christopher Gorham as Henry Grubstick
 Daniel Eric Gold as Matt Hartley
 Val Emmich as Jesse
 David Blue as Cliff St. Paul
 Lindsay Lohan as Kimmie Keegan
 Darin Cleary as Ricky
 Julian De La Celle as DJ
 Eddie Cibrian as Coach Tony Diaz
 Max Ehrich as Randy
 Grant Bowler as Connor Owens
 Ralph Macchio as Archie Rodriguez
 Alec Mapa as Suzuki St. Pierre
 Kevin Kilner as Dr. Mervin Farber
 Alexander Chaplin as Fabian
 Freddy Rodriguez as Gio Rossi
 David Rasche as Calvin Hartley
 Christine Baranski as Victoria Hartley
 Julian De La Celle as Daniel Meade Jr.
 Lauren Vélez as Elena

Guest cast
 Regis Philbin as himself
 Kelly Ripa as herself
 Adriana Lima as herself
 Zac Posen as himself
 Roberta Myers as herself
 Joe Zee as himself
 Liz Smith as herself
 Isaac Mizrahi as himself
 Adele as herself
 Billie Jean King as herself
 Joy Behar as herself
 Elisabeth Hasselbeck as herself
 Antonio Sabato Jr. as himself
 Rachel Maddow as herself
 Nigel Barker as himself
 Robert Verdi as himself
 Naomi Campbell as herself

Music
 ABC released a promotional video featuring the cast singing "New York, New York".
 Australian singer Lenka made a music video of "The Show" showing never-before-seen footage from the third season of Ugly Betty.
 The iTunes Store provided a free music download of both of these features.
 At the end of episode 3, Two of Cups's "Breathe" was played.
 In episode 10, "Bad Amanda", an unreleased track by Lady Gaga titled "Fashion" can be heard.
 In the episode, "When Betty Met YETI", Lady Gaga's "Poker Face" can be heard.
 In the episode "Curveball", another Lady Gaga song, "The Fame", can be heard.

Production
A musical episode and having Lindsay Lohan on board for a storyline were planned for the third season. The two proposed ideas were already in the planning stages during the second season, but were put on hold due to the 2007–2008 Writers Guild of America strike. However, only Lindsay Lohan's storyline came to fruition. (The episode "Granny Pants" involved a plot about a musical, but was not a musical episode.) Despite appearing uncredited in the season two finale "Jump", Lohan appeared (credited) in the episodes "The Manhattan Project", "Granny Pants"  and "Ugly Berry".

Shooting of the episodes moved from Los Angeles to on location shooting in New York City, where the show is set. The last time the show was shot in New York was in the pilot episode. In addition, the season had more physical elements, especially for Betty.

Casting changes
It was announced before the season aired that Rebecca Romijn's character of Alexis Meade, Daniel's male-to-female transgender sister, would be demoted to a recurring character because of Romijn's dissatisfaction with the direction the writers had taken her character. It was speculated that this was in part due to Romijn's then-impending pregnancy. There was also speculation that the move might also have resulted in another regular opting to stay in California because of family and/or other personal commitments, although TV Guide's Michael Ausiello reported that it might be a ploy to ask for a salary increase.

The season opener featured Regis Philbin and Kelly Ripa making a cameo in which Wilhelmina and Alexis appeared on Live with Regis and Kelly, which in turn comes on the heels of Ripa's husband Mark Consuelos having signed up for a multi-episode run in which he played a police detective. Ralph Macchio had a recurring stint beyond his appearance in the fifth episode, where he played a city official. Also, Nikki Blonsky signed on for a guest stint that aired on January 8, 2009.

Christopher Gorham (Henry Grubstick) revealed to TV Guide, in his own words, "The show is moving, I am not." But several days later after Gorham made those comments, TV Guide's Matt Webb, in his video blog, said that he had a different version of the story coming from ABC, which claimed that Gorham would still be part of the cast. On July 11, 2008, TV Guide confirmed that Gorham and Rodriguez would be moving on from Betty as the two actors would be making their last appearances due to other commitments, especially Gorham, who began working on CBS' Harper's Island. However, in a Q&A submitted to Ausiello at his webpage at Entertainment Weekly, he asked Ferrera about the absence of the two actors after they were no-shows at the Season 3 premiere party in New York City on September 12, 2008: "Betty's decision at the beginning of this season is not an ending to anything," Ferrera insisted. "It's more about huge beginnings for her. Christopher [Gorham], who we love and adore, and Freddy [Rodriguez], who is wonderful and so great on our show, are not gone [forever]. You'll never know when they'll pop in or pop out, but they'll be around."

Episodes

Notes:
 ABC placed Ugly Betty on a temporary hiatus after the March 19, 2009 episode to air Samantha Who? and In the Motherhood in the 8-9PM E/P slot, but returned it after the shows complete their runs. Ugly Betty returned on April 30, 2009 to finish its 3rd season, ending with a 2-hour season finale airing on May 21, 2009.

Proposed storylines
Other proposed storyline hints before the season aired, in addition to the ones mentioned already, included Amanda's past and her continued search for her father and more romantic action for Marc and Cliff. 

In an interview about the new direction the series would be taking, Silvio Horta told E!'s Kristin Dos Santos at an ABC press meeting for its show runners, "This season is going to be about growing up. We aren't going to be doing anymore child-like storylines. It is going to be about moving Betty forward." He then added more details to MediaWeek about the changes: "On Ugly Betty I think we started to veer a little too much into the romantic storyline, where it started to really become the show. And it started to just get away from what I originally wanted to do and where we originally started, which was about a girl making it in the city and her work life. So we're trying to refocus that back. But there's always temptation and you want to explore it. You want to have the opportunity to explore it. And the second you start getting too involved in it, it's like any plot line. You go in; it's very hard to get out and it takes a little longer." He later revealed that the audience would see a more evolving Betty: "Betty will solve a crime. Inject Botox. Get attacked by an animal. Throw a Wilhelmina mannequin down a flight of stairs. And that's just the first three episodes."

Webisodes
For the third season, a spin-off online series called Mode After Hours accompanied the main series. The program followed Marc St. James (Michael Urie) and Amanda Tanen (Becki Newton) having fun around the Mode offices when they were not working.ABC.COM LAUNCHES ORIGINAL WEBISODES TODAY FOR "UGLY BETTY" WITH PREMIERE OF "MODE AFTER HOURS" From The Futon Critic (September 24, 2008) There are thirteen lasting 5 minutes in length. Here are the scheduled listings:

September 23, "Guadalaharahh" – Amanda and Marc make fun of Betty and Daniel respectively
September 25, "Friend-iversary VLOG" – It is the "friend-iversary" of when Marc first met Amanda, but Amanda completely forgot about it
October 9, "Bowling for Cliff" – Amanda teaches Marc how to bowl before his bowling date with Cliff
October 16, "Slumber Party Secrets" – Amanda and Marc sleep at Mode, and share some of their secrets.
October 23, "Sommers Seance" – Marc and Amanda organize a seance trying to contact her dead mother Fey
October 30, "Trapped in the Elevator" – Amanda and Marc get locked in the Mode elevator and share their darkest secrets.
October 30, Behind the Scenes Extras and Making of Mode After HoursMarch 19, "Big Package" – Marc and Amanda have their own Christmas with unopened and undelivered office package.
March 23, "April Fools" – Marc and Amanda think of clever ways to trick Betty on April Fools.
March 30, "Roller Girlz" – Marc teaches Amanda how to skate in order to lose weight.
April 8, "Breaking the Band" – Marc and Amanda compete to sing at a local karaoke bar.
April 16, "London Calling" – Marc and Amanda call the Mode UK office for a YETI assignment and end up finding their British counterparts.
April 23, "When Marc Met Mandy" – Marc and Amanda flash back to the first time they ever met.
April 27, "I Spy" – Marc cancels dinner plans with Amanda to spy on his crush, Jake.

DVD release
On March 13, 2009, Walt Disney Studios Home Entertainment announced that the release date of Ugly Betty Season Three, subtitled "Start Spreading the News", would be September 22, 2009 in the United States and Canada. All 24 episodes were included in the set, along with additional "Betty Bloopers", alternative takes, deleted scenes and a featurette, "Coming Home to New York City", detailing the show's return to the Big Apple after having filmed the pilot there.

Among the features:
 Audio Commentary
 Look Who Keeps Popping Up
 Coming Home to New York City
 Mode After Hours – Webisodes
"Gwadalaharahh"
"The Friend-iversary VLOG"
"Bowling for Cliff"
"Slumber Party Secrets"
"Sommers Seance"
"Trapped in the Elevator"
"I Spy"
"Pank Calls"
 Deleted Scenes
 Betty Bloops

 Episodes

UK ratings

* Overnight ratings
Ranks are for Channel 4 and E4 weekly, not for overall TV.
Note: Season 3 of Ugly Betty episodes have now started airing on Wednesday nights on Channel 4 at 10:00 pm instead of the normal Friday night 9:00 pm airing and because of this the E4 first look airing has been moved from Wednesday nights to Tuesday nights. Ugly Betty episodes will not affect or be affected by Big Brother shows/evictions.
Note: As of Monday 12, October 2009 Channel 4's airing of Ugly Betty'' will now be shown on Monday evenings at the normal time of 10:00 pm instead of Wednesday evenings.

References

2008 American television seasons
2009 American television seasons
Ugly Betty